The eastern dwarf mulga snake (Pseudechis pailsei), also known commonly as the eastern pygmy mulga snake and the false king brown snake, is a species of venomous snake in the family Elapidae. The species, which is native to Australia, was genetically confirmed as a distinct species in 2017.

Taxonomy
The eastern dwarf mulga snake was originally described in 1998 as Pailsus pailsei by Raymond Hoser. Wolfgang Wüster identified that its specific name should be spelt pailsi under taxonomic rules in 2001. However, according to the International Code of Zoological Nomenclature (Article 32.5.1) the original spelling should still be used, even though it is an incorrect latinization.

Etymology
The specific name, pailsi, is in honour of Australian reptile breeder Roy Pails (born 1956).

Geographic range
P. pailsi is found in northern Queensland, Australia.

Description

References

Further reading
Cogger H (2014). Reptiles and Amphibians of Australia, Seventh Edition. Clayton, Victoria, Australia: CSIRO Publishing. xxx + 1,033 pp. .
Hoser R (1998). "A New Snake from Queensland, Australia (Serpentes: Elapidae)". Monitor 10 (1): 5–9, 31. (Pailsus, new genus; Pailsus pailsei, new species).
Wilson, Steve; Swan, Gerry (2013). A Complete Guide to Reptiles of Australia, Fourth Edition. Sydney: New Holland Publishers. 522 pp. .
Wüster, Wolfgang; Dumbrell, Alex J.; Hay, Chris; Pook, Catharine E.; Williams, David J.; Fry, Bryan Grieg (2005). "Snakes across the Strait: trans-Torresian phylogeographic relationships in three genera of Australasian snakes (Serpentes: Elapidae: Acanthophis, Oxyuranus, and Pseudechis)". Molecular Phylogenetics and Evolution 34 (1): 1–14.

Pseudechis
Reptiles described in 1998
Snakes of Australia